Two Japanese warships have borne the name Shirataka:

 , a torpedo boat launched in 1899 and stricken in 1923
 , a minelayer launched in 1929 and sunk in 1944

Imperial Japanese Navy ship names
Japanese Navy ship names